The Men's slalom competition of the 2018 Winter Paralympics was held at Jeongseon Alpine Centre,
South Korea. The competition took place on 17 March 2018.

Medal table

10 km classical visually impaired
In the cross-country skiing visually impaired, the athlete with a visual impairment has a sighted guide. The two skiers are considered a team, and dual medals are awarded.

The race was started at 10:00.

10 km classical standing
The race was started at 10:15.

7.5 km sitting
The race was started at 12:40.

See also
Cross-country skiing at the 2018 Winter Olympics

References

Men's 10 kilometre classical